Events from the year 1767 in Wales.

Incumbents
Lord Lieutenant of Anglesey - Sir Nicholas Bayly, 2nd Baronet
Lord Lieutenant of Brecknockshire and Lord Lieutenant of Monmouthshire – Thomas Morgan
Lord Lieutenant of Caernarvonshire - Thomas Wynn
Lord Lieutenant of Cardiganshire – Wilmot Vaughan, 1st Earl of Lisburne
Lord Lieutenant of Carmarthenshire – George Rice
Lord Lieutenant of Denbighshire - Richard Myddelton  
Lord Lieutenant of Flintshire - Sir Roger Mostyn, 5th Baronet 
Lord Lieutenant of Glamorgan – Other Windsor, 4th Earl of Plymouth
Lord Lieutenant of Merionethshire - William Vaughan
Lord Lieutenant of Montgomeryshire – Henry Herbert, 1st Earl of Powis 
Lord Lieutenant of Pembrokeshire – Sir William Owen, 4th Baronet
Lord Lieutenant of Radnorshire – Edward Harley, 4th Earl of Oxford and Earl Mortimer (from 16 July)

Bishop of Bangor – John Egerton
Bishop of Llandaff – John Ewer
Bishop of St Asaph – Richard Newcome
Bishop of St Davids – Charles Moss (from 30 November)

Events
30 April - John Guest becomes manager of Dowlais Ironworks.
29 August - John Wesley begins a two-week evangelical tour of South Wales.
Autumn - Cyfarthfa Ironworks probably first comes into blast.
date unknown - On the death of Daniel Lewis, another local Baptist, Rachel Lewis, hosts meetings of multiple denominations in her home at Merthyr Tydfil.

Arts and literature

New books
Evan Thomas (Ieuan Fardd Ddu) - Traethawd ar Fywyd Ffydd

Painting
Thomas Jones is awarded a premium for landscape painting by the Society of Arts.

Births
25 February - John Roberts, theologian (died 1834)
2 October - John Evans, Baptist minister and writer (died 1827)
date unknown - Hugh Evans (Hywel Eryri), poet (died c.1841)
probable - James Davies, Baptist minister (died 1860)

Deaths
29 April - Sir John Morgan, 4th Baronet, of Llangattock, politician, 56
8 May - Emanuel Bowen, map engraver, 72
11 September - Theophilus Evans, clergyman and historian, 74
17 September - Prince Edward, Duke of York and Albany, second son of Frederick, Prince of Wales, 28
date unknown - Richard Nanney, evangelist, 75/76

References

Wales
Wales